The 1975 NCAA Division I Men's Soccer Tournament was the seventeenth organized men's college soccer tournament by the National Collegiate Athletic Association, to determine the top college soccer team in the United States. The San Francisco Dons won their second national title by defeating the SIU Edwardsville Cougars in the championship game, 4–0. The final match was played on December 7, 1975, in Edwardsville, Illinois, at Ralph Korte Stadium for the second time.

Tournament bracket

Championship Rounds

Third-Place Final

Final

See also
 1975 NCAA Division II Soccer Championship
 1975 NCAA Division III Soccer Championship
 1975 NAIA Soccer Championship

References 

Championship
NCAA Division I Men's Soccer Tournament seasons
NCAA Division I Men's
NCAA Division I Men's Soccer Tournament
NCAA Division I Men's Soccer Tournament